Ila is a local government area in Osun State, Nigeria. Its headquarters are in the town of Ila Orangun.

It has an area of  303 km and a population of 62,049 at the 2006 census.

The postal code of the area is 234.

References

Local Government Areas in Osun State